Asses' Ears or Asses Ears might refer to:

Asses Ears (Alaska), a mountain in the United States
Asses Ears (South Shetland Islands) near Antarctica
Asses Ears (China) near Kwangtung, China